Nothing More is the fourth studio album by the American rock band Nothing More. The album was released on June 24, 2014, and it is the Nothing More's first album with the prominent independent rock label Eleven Seven Music. The songs on Nothing More deal with an array of subject matter such as the mixture of religion, corporations, mental illness, and capitalism.

Themes and composition 
In explaining the song "Mr. MTV", frontman Johnny Hawkins explained "It's not just about MTV specifically, but we use them as an example for a path that many individuals or other companies can go down in life when they choose to value money or ratings or something more than doing something that's, I think, bigger than all that." He further expanded that it "speaks to vacancy of idealism in a world ruled by capitalism and the almighty dollar." The song "Christ Copyright" contains a similar message, with Hawkins explaining that "Christ Copyright is still about the [Mr.] MTV thing. It's serious but it's also like we're playing with the words a little bit because we found it funny to take a word like 'Christ' which is a religious icon and take the word 'Copyright' which is a business sign. In American spirituality or religion, which was a pure thing, have been now mixed with marketing and corporations." He also said its message is to "dar[e] the listener to maintain moral integrity and challenge the social normative" "Jenny" was written about Hawkins sister, Jenna; who struggles with bipolar depression. The music video for Jenny is a depiction of Jenny's life. "Gyre" and "Pyre", meanwhile, are instrumental pieces that contain samples of speeches by the philosopher, Alan Watts.

Promotion and release 
The album's lead single, "This Is the Time (Ballast)", was released on March 11, 2014. An acoustic recording was later released as a stand-alone single on September 23. A music video was released for the album's second single, "Mr. MTV", on September 21 via the band's YouTube and Vevo accounts. A video for the single "Jenny" was released on April 6, 2015. A fourth single was also released – "Here's to the Heartache".

The album was released on June 4, 2014. It debuted at number 33 on the Billboard 200 all-format album chart, selling 8,600 copies in its opening week.

Track listing

Personnel 
 Jonny Hawkins – lead vocals
 Mark Vollelunga – guitar, backing vocals
 Daniel Oliver – bass, keyboards, backing vocals
 Paul O'Brien – drums, percussion
 Paco Estrada – songwriter, backing vocals

Charts

References 

2014 albums
Eleven Seven Label Group albums
Nothing More albums